The 2023 FIA World Rally Championship is the fifty-first season of the World Rally Championship, an auto racing competition recognised by the Fédération Internationale de l'Automobile (FIA) as the highest class of international rallying. Teams and crews compete for the World Rally Championships for Drivers, Co-drivers, Manufacturers and Teams. Crews are free to compete in cars complying with Groups Rally1 to Rally5 regulations; however, only manufacturers competing with Rally1 cars homologated are eligible to score points in the manufacturers' championship. The championship began in January 2023 with the Monte Carlo Rally and is set to conclude in November 2023 with the Rally Japan. The series is supported by the World Rally Championship-2 and World Rally Championship-3 categories at every round of the championship and by the Junior World Rally Championship at selected events.

Kalle Rovanperä and Jonne Halttunen are the reigning drivers' and co-drivers' champions, having secured their first championship titles at the 2022 Rally New Zealand. Toyota are the defending manufacturers' champions.

After the third round, Sébastien Ogier and Vincent Landais respectively lead the drivers' and co-drivers' championship by three points over Thierry Neuville and Martijn Wydaeghe. Reigning world champions Kalle Rovanperä and Jonne Halttunen are third, a further one point behind. In the manufacturers' championship, reigning manufacturers' champions Toyota Gazoo Racing WRT hold a twenty-seven-point lead over Hyundai Shell Mobis WRT, with M-Sport Ford WRT in third.

Calendar

The 2023 season is scheduled to be contested over thirteen rounds crossing Europe, Africa, North and South America and Asia.

Calendar changes
The championship was expected to be expanded to fourteen rounds, with eight Europe-based rallies and six fly-away events covering the season. However, the number of the events was reduced to thirteen following a lengthy delay of the calendar. The anticipated rally based in Jeddah in Saudi Arabia was absent from the calendar.

The organizers of the rally had previously held a national event in 2022 in the bid of a 2023 return.
Central Europe Rally, a tri-nation event running a day each in Germany, Austria and Czech Republic, was introduced into the championship, replacing Rally de Catalunya. The rally would be based out of southeast Germany, in the city of Passau in Bavaria, and is set to run on tarmac.
Rally New Zealand, a round of the 2022 season, would not be included on the calendar, but the organizers are seeking an opportunity for a  return as a part of the rotation program with Rally Australia.
Ypres Rally Belgium, which has been a part of the championship for the last two seasons, dropped off the calendar and would instead be featured for the 2023 British Rally Championship.

Several rally organizers also expressed their interests to return to the championship, including events in Argentina, Australia, Northern Ireland and Germany. Bids of Argentina and Northern Ireland were ultimately failed. In addition to the candidate events, the WRC Promoter GmbH was also working on the calendar expansion to the Middle East and United States.

Location changes
The headquarter of the Rally Italia Sardegna would be once again moved from Alghero to Olbia. The 2020 event was previously based in Olbia as a result of major route revisions due to the COVID-19 pandemic.
The 2023 edition of the Safari Rally is set to be based at the Lakeside town of Naivasha. The rally was previously based in the Kenyan capital Nairobi.

Contracted crews
The following teams, drivers and co-drivers are under contracts to contest the championship under Rally1 regulations.

The below crews were not entered to score manufacturer points and were entered in Rally1 cars as privateers or under arrangement with the manufacturers.

In detail

M-Sport signed a full-year deal with Ott Tänak and Martin Järveoja, who terminated their contract with Hyundai despite having a multi-year deal. Pierre-Louis Loubet's campaign with the team was expanded to full-time as a manufacturer-registered points scorer. Nicolas Gilsoul, former navigator alongside Thierry Neuville, became Loubet's new co-driver. Adrien Fourmaux was demoted to the team's WRC-2 program, joining Grégoire Munster. M-Sport long-time privateer Jourdan Serderidis continued with the team to contest at selected events. Gus Greensmith left the team after eight-year partnership. He is due to drive for Toksport to compete under the WRC-2 championship.

Hyundai retained Thierry Neuville and Martijn Wydaeghe. They would be joined by Esapekka Lappi and Janne Ferm as the team's full-time crews. He shared the third car with the crew led by Dani Sordo, who had previously planned to retire at the end of 2022 season. Oliver Solberg and Elliott Edmondson were dropped from the team. They moved to Toksport to compete the WRC-2 category. Former Renault Formula One manager Cyril Abiteboul became Hyundai's new team principal.

Toyota retained the crew of Elfyn Evans and Scott Martin and of Kalle Rovanperä and Jonne Halttunen as their two full-time competitors. As the defending champions, Rovanperä and Halttunen kept their car number 69 for the season, instead of opting for the number 1 plate. Takamoto Katsuta and Aaron Johnston stepped up to the works team to share the third car with Sébastien Ogier, who was co-driven by Vincent Landais. The team's fourth car is available for private users when Ogier does not compete. This decipline first applied to Lorenzo Bertelli and Simone Scattolin at the 2023 Rally Sweden.

Regulation changes
Rally organisers can include an optional Tyre warming zone (TWZ) between the Time Control (TC) and the start of a Special Stage, as well as evening flexi-service for Rally1 cars was limited to a maximum of two hours every rally weekend. Morning service on gravel rallies would also be removed. 

The allocation of pre-event test days for the manufacturers was also reduced from 28 days to 21. This change was intended to reduce cost.

Season report

Opening rounds
The season opener belonged to Sébastien Ogier and Vincent Landais, who won the first rally of his career. This was also Ogier's ninth win at the Monte Carlo Rally, surpassing Sébastien Loeb to become the driver who wins most victories in Monte-Carlo. The second round, Rally Sweden, saw Ott Tänak and Martin Järveoja took an early lead, before losing to Craig Breen and James Fulton on Friday evening. However, Tänak and Järveoja fought back on Saturday evening, and eventually won the event.

After absence from Sweden, Ogier and Landais came back at the Rally Mexico, where they won another victory after capitalizing their relative late road position. Despite only competing two rounds, they still led the championships.

Results and standings

Season summary

Scoring system
Points are awarded to the top ten classified finishers in each event. In the manufacturers' championship, teams are eligible to nominate three crews to score points, but these points are only awarded to the top two classified finishers representing a manufacturer and driving a 2022-specification Rally1 car. There are also five bonus points awarded to the winners of the Power Stage, four points for second place, three for third, two for fourth and one for fifth. Power Stage points are awarded in the drivers', co-drivers' and manufacturers' championships.

FIA World Rally Championship for Drivers
The driver who records a top-ten finish is taken into account for the championship regardless of the categories.

FIA World Rally Championship for Co-Drivers
The co-driver who records a top-ten finish is taken into account for the championship regardless of the categories.

FIA World Rally Championship for Manufacturers
Only the best two results of each manufacturer in the respective overall classification and Power Stage at each rally are taken into account for the championship.

Notes

References

External links
  
 FIA World Rally Championship 2023 at eWRC-results.com

 
World Rally Championship seasons
World Rally Championship
World Rally Championship
World Rally Championship